ABC Australia, formerly Australia Television International (or just Australia Television),  ABC Asia Pacific, Australia Network and Australia Plus, is an Australian pay television channel, launched in 1993 and operated by the Australian Broadcasting Corporation as part of the ABC television network of services. The channel broadcasts a mix of programming, including lifestyle, drama, sports, English-language learning programs, children's programming and news and current affairs to  viewers across East Asia, Central Asia, South Asia, Southeast Asia and Pacific Islands.

It is partially funded by Australia's Department of Foreign Affairs & Trade, as well as some advertising (unlike the ABC's domestic television services).

History

Origins
Radio Australia had been operating as part of the ABC since 1939 while the passing of the Australian Broadcasting Corporation Act 1983 allowed the corporation to operate an additional international television service. The channel was originally proposed by directors Mark Armstrong and David Hill, who felt that a television channel would further heighten Australia's presence in the Asia-Pacific region and demonstrate the ABC's technical abilities.

Prime Minister Paul Keating launched Australia Television International on 17 February 1993, televised live to 50 countries in the south-east Asian region, from the ABC's television studios in Gore Hill, Sydney. The actual broadcast was from the Darwin uplink where Dominic Stone, the service's Program Director and David Hill, managing director of the ABC commissioned the first transmission. It was originally a part of the so-called "Gang of Five", which was a consortium that was set up to compete against Star TV in the region. (The others in the group were CNN International, HBO, ESPN International [with its Asian operations] and TVB [with TVB Superchannel]) The consortium's channels were initially transmitted via Palapa satellite, but were later also added to Apstar satellite.

The operation of the new channel was funded by a combination of government subsidies and commercial sponsorship. The presence of commercials, not previously seen or heard on the ABC, resulted in the creation of an updated edition of the ABC Editorial and Programme Practices, stipulating that the "Australia Television service will retain editorial control and independence in all programming".

Funding cuts made in the 1997–1998 federal budget, and recommendations made in the Mansfield Report, meant that control of Australia Television was handed over to the Seven Network in 1998. Under Seven's direction the channel continued to receive federal funding, and carry some ABC News.

2002–2006: ABC Asia Pacific
Despite efforts made by Seven to expand into Asia using the service, it continued to lose money. In 2001, the government announced a five-year,  tender for the service – at the time watched primarily by Australian expatriates for its news programmes, football coverage, and children's programming. Seven chose not to bid, while Imparja Television's application was unsuccessful. The ABC won the contract and Australia Television was rebranded as ABC Asia Pacific on 1 January 2002 (or 31 December 2001?), with content from the Seven Network, Nine Network, Network Ten, and the ABC's own original content, as well as news bulletins produced by Sky News Australia.

The tender was renewed in 2005; the ABC was re-awarded control of the service until 8 August 2011, over other applicants including Sky News Australia. Soon afterwards, the network stopped showing content from Sky News Australia, replaced with bulletins produced by the ABC's own news and current affairs division from its Southbank studios in Melbourne.

2006–2014: Australia Network

ABC Asia Pacific changed its name to Australia Network on 7 August 2006, at the same time introducing a number of new programs, as well as the expansion of its existing news programs and English-language learning programs. Following a restructure of the ABC in early 2007, Australia Network became a part of the corporation's International, Corporate Strategy and Governance division.

The channel was not available in Australia or New Zealand, owing to rights restrictions, although ABC News for Australia Network bulletins were carried overnight on ABC News 24 and Al Jazeera English in Australia and on Face TV in New Zealand. Several Australia Network programmes are also available online in Australia on the ABC's iview platform. Australia Network became available in Malaysia on Astro (Channel 514) in December 2008.

In 2010 the Rudd government invited media organisations to submit tenders to deliver the Australia Network for 10 years. In November 2011, the Government closed the tender, "due to significant leaks of confidential information to the media", and asked the Australian Federal Police to investigate. In the meantime, the ABC's contract was extended until August 2012 to allow time for a decision to be made on its future. On 5 December 2011, the Government announced that the Australia Network would no longer be open to tender and that the ABC would take over its operations permanently. Concerns were raised about the process, and the Australian National Audit Office noted that the tender process "presented the Australian Government in a poor light and cost the two tenderers... time and money". The government was obliged to pay millions in compensation to Sky News.

In the 2014–2015 Australian federal budget by the Abbott government, all funding to the Australia Network was cut and its closure was announced, days before it was about to sign a contract with Shanghai Media Holdings to begin broadcasting in China (making it only the third foreign broadcaster with access to the country). 80 jobs, mostly in Melbourne, were lost and the government was forced to compensate the ABC  for breaking its contract, which had been promised  in funding for ten years of operation by the previous Labor government.

2014–2018: Australia Plus
Following the closure of Australia Network, Australia Plus, a new multi-platform international service was launched on 29 September 2014 as a replacement. The channel continued to broadcast entertainment, sports, education and English learning shows from ABC through Asia and Pacific partners. Big events from Australia, such as Melbourne Cup, Sydney's New Year's Eve Fireworks and the Sydney to Hobart Yacht Race were also featured on the channel.

In 2015, the New Zealand government established Pasifika TV, a service providing Pacific island broadcasters with a 24/7 feed of sport, news and other content. Most of it is from New Zealand.

In August 2016, three commercial partners, the Government of Victoria, vitamin and supplement company Swisse and Monash University signed contracts with Australia Plus. Under the Australian Broadcasting Corporation Act 1983 the ABC International Division is allowed to operate as a commercial operation, in a way similar to BBC Worldwide.

2018–present: ABC Australia
Australia Plus was rebranded as ABC Australia on 1 July 2018. ABC Head of International Strategy David Hua said, “The rebranding of the international television service makes sense to our audiences overseas, who want distinctive Australian content from a highly-respected media organisation.” The rebranding came just weeks after the lifting of the geo-blocking of the ABC News live stream on the ABC website and YouTube channels.

In 2020, the Australian Government established PacificAus TV, which offers 1000 hours of free Australian commercial TV each year to Pacific island broadcasters.

Description
The channel broadcasts a mix of programming, including lifestyle, drama, sports, English-language learning programs, children's programming and news and current affairs. The service is available via subscription to viewers across East Asia, Central Asia, South Asia, Southeast Asia and Pacific Islands, including India, Japan, Vietnam, Afghanistan, the Philippines, Papua New Guinea and Vanuatu.

Programming
In addition to those listed below, the now rebadged ABC Australia shows a range of programming targeted at audiences within the region, including evening news bulletins at two-hour intervals targeted at different parts of the region, and a number of English-language educational programs produced by the Network including Study English, Living English, English Bites and The Business of English. Drama series shown include Home and Away, Offspring, Packed to the Rafters, Rake, The Doctor Blake Mysteries, The Time of Our Lives, factual entertainment programs Bondi Vet, One Plus One (TV program), and Cosmo Times, lifestyle programs Big Break, Food Safari and Poh's Kitchen, music program Rage, light entertainment programs Gruen Planet, Good Game and Good Game SP, the children's shows Play School, Blue Water High, A gURLs wURLd, and Scope.

The news programming of the channel is produced and broadcast from the news studios in Sydney, the headquarters of the ABC News channel and the network news service.

Funding
ABC Australia is partially funded by Australia's Department of Foreign Affairs & Trade, as well as some advertising (unlike the ABC's domestic television services).

Along with the rest of the ABC, the channel has suffered from successive funding cuts, particularly under Liberal governments since the 1996 Howard government, with particularly deep cuts in 2014 under the Abbott government and an ongoing indexation freeze .

Other international services
ABC Radio Australia was launched in 1939, and continues to broadcast in the Asia-Pacific region although no longer on short-wave transmission, so does not reach all of the remote islands.

The ABC has increased its Internet presence for international audiences; the iview streaming service is available via an app, and ABC News Online includes Chinese-language and Tok Pisin articles.

Slogans
Everyone's ABC Asia Pacific (2002–2006)
A different view (Australia Network, 2006–2010)
From our world to yours (Australia Network, 2010–2014)
Your World, Our World, One World (Australia Plus, 2014–2018)
Yours (2018–present)

See also
Australian Broadcasting Corporation
History of the Australian Broadcasting Corporation
Radio Australia

References

Further reading

External links

Australian Broadcasting Corporation television
Cable television in Hong Kong
International broadcasters
Television channels and stations established in 1993
1993 establishments in Australia